The Snake is an album by the Swedish duo Wildbirds & Peacedrums, released in 2008. It was recorded by the band and published by The Leaf Label. It was released to 'generally favorable reviews' with an average critic's score of 80/100 and an average user score of 9.6/10 on Metacritic.

In 2015, Apple selected the song "There Is No Light" to soundtrack the launch of their new streaming service, Apple Music.

Track listing
"Island" – 2:33
"There Is No Light" – 2:46
"Chain of Steel" – 3:47
"So Soft So Pink" – 6:23
"Places" – 4:26
"Great Lines" – 5:37
"Today/Tomorrow" – 3:04
"Liar Lion" – 3:53
"Who Ho Ho Ho" – 2:51
"My Heart" – 7:38

References

2007 albums
Wildbirds & Peacedrums albums
The Leaf Label albums